Irina Demick (16 October 1936 in Pommeuse, Seine-et-Marne – 8 October 2004), sometimes credited as Irina Demich or Irina Demik, was a French actress with a brief career in American films.

Biography
Born Irina Dziemiach, of Russian ancestry, in Pommeuse, Seine-et-Marne, she went to Paris and became a model. She made an appearance in a French film Julie la rousse (1959) and met producer Darryl F. Zanuck and became his lover. Zanuck had a long history of trying to turn his European mistresses into film starshe had previously done this with Bella Darvi and Juliette Gréco, and would later do this with Genevieve Gilles. Zanuck cast Demick in his epic production The Longest Day (1962) as a French resistance fighter.

Demick's career continued with roles in OSS se déchaîne (1963), The Visit (1964), Un monsieur de compagnie (1964) and Up from the Beach (1965). In 1965, she played in La Métamorphose des cloportes, and seven roles in Those Magnificent Men in Their Flying Machines, each one of a different nationality.

After making a few more films including Prudence and the Pill (1968) and Le Clan des Siciliens (The Sicilian Clan, 1969), and two Italian horror films in 1972, Demick's career faded and came to a standstill.

In 1964, she married Philippe Wahl, a Swiss entrepreneur. Together they lived in Rome and Paris. After her divorce in 1979, she moved to the U.S. She died in Indianapolis, Indiana.

Selected filmography
Julie the Redhead (1959)
The Longest Day (1962) as Janine Boitard
OSS se déchaîne (1963) as Lucia
The Visit (1964) as Anya 
Un monsieur de compagnie (1964) as Nicole
Up from the Beach  (1965) as Lili Rolland
Those Magnificent Men in Their Flying Machines (1965) as Brigitte / Ingrid / Marlene / Françoise / Yvette / Betty
La Métamorphose des cloportes (1965) as Catherine Verdier
Once a Greek (1966) as Chloé Saloniki
Tiffany Memorandum (1967) as Sylvie Meynard
Prudence and the Pill (1968) as Elizabeth Brett
La porta del cannone (1969) as Rada Kálmán
The Archangel (1969) as Sig.ra Taroochi Roda
The Sicilian Clan (1969) as Jeanne Manalese 
 (1970) as Anna
Quella chiara notte d'ottobre (1970)
Goya, a Story of Solitude (1971) as Duchess d'Alba
Naked Girl Killed in the Park (1972) as Magda Wallenberger
Tragic Ceremony (1972) as Bill's mother (final film role)

References

External links

 http://starletshowcase.blogspot.com/2008/08/cool-french-underground-girls.html

1936 births
2004 deaths
People from Seine-et-Marne
French film actresses
French people of Russian descent
French emigrants to the United States
20th-century French actresses